B, or b, is the second letter of the Latin-script alphabet, used in the modern English alphabet, the alphabets of other western European languages and others worldwide. Its name in English is bee (pronounced ), plural bees. It represents the voiced bilabial stop in many languages, including English. In some other languages, it is used to represent other bilabial consonants.

History

Old English was originally written in runes, whose equivalent letter was beorc , meaning "birch". Beorc dates to at least the 2nd-century Elder Futhark, which is now thought to have derived from the Old Italic alphabets'  either directly or via Latin .

The uncial  and half-uncial  introduced by the Gregorian and Irish missions gradually developed into the Insular scripts' . These Old English Latin alphabets supplanted the earlier runes, whose use was fully banned under King Canute in the early 11th century. The Norman Conquest popularised the Carolingian half-uncial forms which latter developed into blackletter . Around 1300, letter case was increasingly distinguished, with upper- and lower-case B taking separate meanings. Following the advent of printing in the 15th century, Holy Roman Empire (Germany) and Scandinavia continued to use forms of blackletter (particularly Fraktur), while England eventually adopted the humanist and antiqua scripts developed in Renaissance Italy from a combination of Roman inscriptions and Carolingian texts. The present forms of the English cursive B were developed by the 17th century.

The Roman  derived from the Greek capital beta  via its Etruscan and Cumaean variants. The Greek letter was an adaptation of the Phoenician letter bēt . The Egyptian hieroglyph for the consonant /b/ had been an image of a foot and calf , but bēt (Phoenician for "house") was a modified form of a Proto-Sinaitic glyph  probably adapted from the separate hieroglyph Pr  meaning "house". The Hebrew letter bet  is a separate development of the Phoenician letter.

By Byzantine times, the Greek letter  came to be pronounced /v/, so that it is known in modern Greek as víta (still written ). The Cyrillic letter ve  represents the same sound, so a modified form known as be  was developed to represent the Slavic languages' /b/. (Modern Greek continues to lack a letter for the voiced bilabial plosive and transliterates such sounds from other languages using the digraph/consonant cluster , mp.)

Use in writing systems

English
In English,  denotes the voiced bilabial stop , as in bib. In English, it is sometimes silent. The  in debt, doubt, subtle, and related words was added in the 16th century as an etymological spelling, intended to make the words more like their Latin originals (debitum, dubito, subtilis).

For example, compare the various cognates of the word brother. It is the seventh least frequently used letter in the English language (after V, K, J, X, Q, and Z), with a frequency of about 1.5% in words.

Other languages

Many other languages besides English use  to represent a voiced bilabial stop.

In Estonian, Danish, Faroese, Icelandic, Scottish Gaelic and Mandarin Chinese Pinyin,  does not denote a voiced consonant. In Fijian  represents a prenasalised , whereas in Zulu and Xhosa it represents an implosive , in contrast to the digraph  which represents . Finnish uses  only in loanwords.

Phonetic transcription

In the International Phonetic Alphabet, [b] is used to represent the voiced bilabial stop phone. In phonological transcription systems for specific languages, /b/ may be used to represent a lenis phoneme, not necessarily voiced, that contrasts with fortis /p/ (which may have greater aspiration, tenseness or duration).

Other uses

B is also a musical note. In English-speaking countries, it represents Si, the 12th note of a chromatic scale built on C. In Central Europe and Scandinavia, "B" is used to denote B-flat and the 12th note of the chromatic scale is denoted "H". Archaic forms of 'b', the b quadratum (square b) and b rotundum (round b) are used in musical notation as the symbols for natural and flat, respectively.

In Contracted (grade 2) English braille, 'b' stands for "but" when in isolation.

In computer science, B is the symbol for byte, a unit of information storage.

In engineering, B is the symbol for bel, a unit of level.

In chemistry, B is the symbol for boron, a chemical element.

The blood-type B emoji (🅱️) was added in Unicode 6.0 in 2010, and became a popular internet meme in 2018 where letters would be replaced with the emoji.

Related characters

Ancestors, descendants and siblings
 𐤁 : Semitic letter Bet, from which the following symbols originally derive
 Β β : Greek letter Beta, from which B derives
 Ⲃ ⲃ Coptic letter Bēta, which derives from Greek Beta
 В в : Cyrillic letter Ve, which also derives from Beta
 Б б : Cyrillic letter Be, which also derives from Beta
 ʙ : A small capital B, used as the lowercase B in a number of alphabets during romanization
 𐌁 : Old Italic B, which derives from Greek Beta
 ᛒ : Runic letter Berkanan, which probably derives from Old Italic B
 𐌱 : Gothic letter bercna, which derives from Greek Beta
 IPA-specific symbols related to B:    𐞄 𐞅
 B with diacritics: Ƀ ƀ Ḃ ḃ Ḅ ḅ Ḇ ḇ Ɓ ɓ ᵬ ᶀ
 Ꞗ ꞗ : B with flourish
 ᴃ ᴯ B b : Barred B and various modifier letters are used in the Uralic Phonetic Alphabet.
 Ƃ ƃ : B with topbar

Derived ligatures, abbreviations, signs and symbols
 ␢ : 
 ฿ : Thai baht
 ₿ : Bitcoin
 ♭: The flat in music, mentioned above, still closely resembles lowercase b.

Code points 
These are the code points for the forms of the letter in various systems

 1

Other representations

Use as a number
In the hexadecimal (base 16) numbering system, B is a number that corresponds to the number 11 in decimal (base 10) counting.

Notes

References

External links
 
 
 
 

ISO basic Latin letters